G. Love and Special Sauce is the debut album by G. Love & Special Sauce released on May 10, 1994, via Epic Records. The album was certified Gold after selling 500,000 copies. It contains the song "Cold Beverage," which became a college-radio staple, as well as "Baby's Got Sauce," which Seattle's KEXP-FM 90.3 called the song of the year.

Legacy
The album was included in the book 1001 Albums You Must Hear Before You Die.

Track listing
"The Things That I Used to Do" – 3:35
"Blues Music" – 4:17
"Garbage Man" – 4:51
"Eyes Have Miles" – 5:22
"Baby's Got Sauce" – 3:54
"Rhyme for the Summertime" – 3:06
"Cold Beverage" – 2:33
"Fatman" – 4:16
"This Ain't Living" – 6:34
"Walk to Slide" – 4:28
"Shooting Hoops (with Mou Akoon)" – 3:31
"Some Peoples Like That" – 4:49
"Town to Town" – 3:33
"I Love You" – 3:32

Personnel
 G. Love & Special Sauce
G. Love – lead vocals, guitar, harmonica
Jeffrey Clemens – drums, percussion, background vocals
Jimi "Jazz" Prescott – string bass

 Additional musicians
Scott Storch – piano
Jasper – additional lead vocals

References

External links
G. Love & Special Sauce Official site

G. Love & Special Sauce albums
1994 debut albums
Albums produced by Scott Storch